Robert Lopshire (April 14, 1927  – May 4, 2002) is best known for his popular children's book Put Me In the Zoo.

Life and career 
Lopshire was born in Sarasota, Florida.  He attended the city's elementary and high schools.  Lophsire served in the Navy Coast Guard during World War II in the Pacific theater aboard assault landing ships.

Lopshire is best known for being an author, illustrator and creative art director (for a short time early on) for Beginner Books.   He wrote the best selling children's book, Put Me in the Zoo.

Books

As Author and Illustrator
 Put Me in the Zoo (his first writings)
 I Want to Be Somebody New!: A Sequel to Put Me in the Zoo/I Want To Be Somebody New!
 New Tricks I Can Do!
 Put Me in the Alphabet!
 I Want to Count Something New! (his final work before his death)
 The Biggest, Smallest, Fastest, Tallest Things You've Ever Heard of
 I Am Better Than You
 ABC Games
 It's Magic
 A Beginner's Guide to Building & Flying Model Airplanes
 How to make Snop Snappers & Other Fine Things
 The Beginner Book of Things To Make: fun stuff you can make all by yourself (formerly published as "How to make Flibbers, etc: a book of things to make & do") 
 and others!

As Illustrator
 Ann Can Fly by Fred Phleger (his first pictures)
 Wish Again, Big Bear by Richard Margolis
 Little New Kangaroo by Bernard Wiseman
 The Pig War by Betty Baker
 Big Max by Kin Platt
 Big Max in the Mystery of the Missing Moose by Kin Platt

His work with his others is included in:
The Big Blue Book of Beginner Books (featuring "Put Me In The Zoo")
The Big Red Book of Beginner Books (featuring "I Want To Be Somebody New!")
The Big Aqua Book of Beginner Books (featuring "New Tricks I Can Do!" - his final work after his death on May 4, 2002)

References

1927 births
2002 deaths
American children's writers
American illustrators
People from Sarasota, Florida